Worthley Peak is a peak, 840 m, at the north end of Benson Ridge overlooking lower Robb Glacier. Mapped by the United States Geological Survey (USGS) from tellurometer surveys and Navy air photos, 1960–62. Named by Advisory Committee on Antarctic Names (US-ACAN) for Elmer G. Worthley, United States Antarctic Research Program (USARP) bryologist at McMurdo Sound, 1958–59.

Mountains of the Ross Dependency
Shackleton Coast